Perinthina is a subtribe of rove beetles in the subfamily Aleocharinae.

References

External links 
 Perinthina at insectoid.info

Aleocharinae
Insect subtribes